St Inez creek is a creek in Panjim, in the Indian state of Goa. The creek opens up into the Mandovi River.
The creek begins at the paddy fields at Altinho hill at Taleigao, Caranzalem, and the Nagahali hills of Dona Paula. Caculo Island, is located in the creek. The creek has 12 culverts that originate from the old Goa Medical College complex leading to the Campal head, the Fire Brigade, the sewerage treatment plant at Tonca, the Tambdi Mati Cumrabhat, and the El Passo hotel.

According to a Portuguese plaque on one of the culverts, the creek dates back to 1829, although Historian Percival Noronha dates it back to 1647.

References
Panaji Expo

Estuaries of India
Landforms of Goa
Geography of Panaji